Cosmo's Factory is the fifth studio album by American rock band Creedence Clearwater Revival, released by Fantasy Records in July 1970. Six of the album's eleven tracks were released as singles in 1970, and all of them charted in the top 5 of the Billboard Hot 100. The album spent nine consecutive weeks in the number one position on the Billboard 200 chart and was certified 4x platinum by the RIAA in 1990.

Background
With the release of Cosmo's Factory in July 1970, Creedence Clearwater Revival hit their commercial zenith. It was their fifth album in two years and became an international smash, topping the album charts in six countries. The band also toured Europe in 1970, playing the Royal Albert Hall to enthusiastic audiences, and had emerged as the most popular band in America by largely ignoring the trippy acid rock indulgences that were typical of the era. However, despite the band's infectious blend of rockabilly, folk, and R&B, some peers and rock critics dismissed them as a singles band with no substance. In a 2012 cover story, Uncut observed: "While San Francisco longhairs across the bridge scoffed at their commercialism, Creedence henceforth made a point of releasing double A-sides. And invariably both songs would have an uncanny knack of cutting through to all sections of the population." Singer and lead guitarist John Fogerty, who had seemingly arrived out of nowhere, but had actually struggled with his bandmates throughout most of the 1960s as the Blue Velvets and the Golliwogs, composed the group's songs and generally steered the band artistically, although his grip on the band – including his dubious role as manager – irritated the others, especially his older brother Tom Fogerty, who left the band by the end of 1970.

Composition
Perhaps more than any other Creedence album, Cosmo's Factory displays the wide range of musical ingredients that provided the foundation for their "swamp rock" sound: R&B ("Before You Accuse Me", "My Baby Left Me"), soul ("I Heard It Through the Grapevine", "Long As I Can See the Light"), country ("Lookin' Out My Back Door"), rockabilly and classic rock and roll ("Ooby Dooby", "Travelin' Band"), and psychedelia ("Ramble Tamble").

"Travelin' Band" was inspired by 1950s rock 'n' roll songs, particularly those by Little Richard. In October 1972, the company that held the publishing rights to Richard's "Good Golly, Miss Molly" felt "Travelin' Band" bore enough similarities to warrant a plagiarism lawsuit that was later settled out of court. The song's flip side, "Who'll Stop the Rain", could not have been more different, with Fogerty telling Uncut in 2012: "'Travelin' Band' was my salute to Little Richard, but 'Who'll Stop The Rain?' was part of the fabric of the times. From '68 to '74, Vietnam was probably the most important thing on the minds of young people." "Run Through the Jungle" mined similar territory, with many listeners believing the lyrics to be about the war. According to the band's bassist Stu Cook, the song's opening and closing both feature jungle sound effects created by "lots of backwards recorded guitar and piano." The song was rhythm guitarist Tom Fogerty's favorite CCR song: "My all-time favorite Creedence tune was 'Run Through the Jungle'. It's like a little movie in itself with all the sound effects. It never changes key, but it holds your interest the whole time. It's like a musician's dream. It never changes key, yet you get the illusion it does."

"Lookin' Out My Back Door" was a direct tribute to the Bakersfield Sound, a style of music that influenced John Fogerty and the Creedence sound – Buck Owens, one of the architects of the Bakersfield Sound, is even mentioned in the lyrics. The song is known for its upbeat tempo, its down-home feel, and a change in key and tempo towards the end. The lyrics, filled with colorful, dream-like imagery, led some to believe the song was about drugs (according to the drug theory, the "flying spoon" in the song was a cocaine spoon, and the crazy animal images were an acid trip). Fogerty, however, has repeatedly stated in interviews that the song was actually written for his son, Josh, who was three years old at the time, and said the reference to a parade passing by was inspired by the Dr. Seuss book And to Think That I Saw It on Mulberry Street.

Although CCR was well known for its concise, tightly arranged songs, Cosmo's Factory features two longer cuts: the seven-minute opener, "Ramble Tamble", and an 11-minute cover of Marvin Gaye's "I Heard It Through the Grapevine". The band had dabbled with psychedelia on their debut single, "Susie Q", but the storming "Ramble Tamble" is more ambitious, beginning with the band roaring through a rockabilly introduction before transitioning into a psychedelic wall of sound that lasts nearly four minutes and then transitioning back into the original rockabilly section near the end. The song has been singled out for critical praise, with music journalist Steven Hyden calling it "the most rockin' song of all time". As Cook explained to Bill Kopp of musoscribe.com: "Each album had a longish track on it, but they were never jams, per se...'Heard It Through the Grapevine' had a little jammy character to it, but they were all pretty structured. There was no space to noodle. Live, there was a little bit of noodling, but in the studio we always tried to nail the arrangement."

Several songs on the album pay tribute to the band's blues and rock and roll roots, including Big Arthur Crudup's "My Baby Left Me" (a notable cover of which had previously been recorded by Elvis Presley), Bo Diddley's "Before You Accuse Me", and the rockabilly classic "Ooby Dooby".

Album title and artwork
The name of the album comes from the warehouse in Berkeley where the band rehearsed early in their career, which was dubbed "The Factory" by drummer Doug "Cosmo" Clifford, because bandleader John Fogerty made them practice there almost every day. In 2013, Clifford recalled to Goldmine that "John knew the press would be all over us for the album, so he said that he would name the album after me and that I would have to deal with it. He wanted the pressure off of him. It was our biggest album ever and I tell people that they named it after me, so it had to be a hit [laughter]. That's a joke!"

The cover photo was taken by Bob Fogerty, brother of John and Tom. As David Cavanagh of Uncut wrote in 2012: "The album's front cover showed the four of them caught by a camera in an off-duty moment, a proudly uncool quartet who looked more like lumberjacks than rock stars." The handwritten sign affixed to the support post at the left of the photo that reads "3RD GENERATION" is an ironic reference to something rock music critic Ralph Gleason wrote in the liner notes of the band's debut album: "Creedence Clearwater Revival is an excellent example of the Third Generation of San Francisco bands".

Critical reception

In its original review, Rolling Stone opined: "It should be obvious by now that Creedence Clearwater Revival is one great rock and roll band. Cosmo's Factory, the group's fifth album, is another good reason why."

AllMusic states: "On 'Long as I Can See the Light', the record's final song, he again finds solace in home, anchored by a soulful, laid-back groove. It hits a comforting, elegiac note, the perfect way to draw Cosmo's Factory – an album made during stress and chaos, filled with raging rockers, covers, and intense jams – to a close." An editorial review from Amazon.com calls the album "the peak of a prolific streak."

Accolades
In 2003, the album was ranked number 265 on Rolling Stones list of the 500 greatest albums of all time; it was ranked number 413 on the revised 2020 list.

Commercial performance
In January 1970, the double A-sided "Travelin' Band"/"Who'll Stop the Rain" single peaked at number two on the Billboard Hot 100 chart. In April, the band released the double A-sided "Up Around the Bend"/"Run Through the Jungle" single, which reached number four on the Hot 100, and started their first tour of Europe. Cosmo's Factory was released in July 1970, as was the band's ninth single, "Lookin' Out My Back Door"/"Long as I Can See the Light", which reached number two on the Hot 100.

The album was certified gold (500,000 units sold) by the Recording Industry Association of America on December 16, 1970. Almost 20 years later, on December 13, 1990, it received a certification of four times platinum, indicating sales of over four million copies.

Track listing

 Sides one and two were combined as tracks 1–11 on CD reissues.

Personnel
Source:
 John Fogerty – lead guitar, lead vocals, piano, electric piano, keyboards, saxophone, harmonica, producer, arranger 
 Tom Fogerty – rhythm guitar, backing vocals
 Stu Cook – bass guitar, backing vocals
 Doug Clifford – drums, cowbell
 Russ Gary – engineer
 Bob Fogerty – cover art, design, photography

Charts

Weekly charts

Year-end charts

Certifications

Release history

References

External links

 Cosmo's Factory Infosite

Creedence Clearwater Revival albums
1970 albums
Albums produced by John Fogerty
Albums recorded at Wally Heider Studios
Bellaphon Records albums
Liberty Records albums
Fantasy Records albums